Bagwai is a local government area in Kano State, Nigeria. It's headquarter is in the town of Ɓagwai.

It has an area of 405 km and had a population of 162,847 in the 2006 census.
The third biggest dam in Kano State Watari Dam is located in Bagwai.
The postal code of the area is 701.

Wards
There are ten wards in Bagwai local government:
Bagwai
Dangada
Gadanya
Gogori
Kiyawa
Kwajale
Rimin Dako
Romo
Sare-Sare
Wuro Bagga

References

Local Government Areas in Kano State